Bernhard Heiden (b. Frankfurt-am-Main, August 24, 1910; d. Bloomington, IN, April 30, 2000) was a German and American composer and music teacher, who studied under and was heavily influenced by Paul Hindemith. Bernhard Heiden, the son of Ernst Levi and Martha (Heiden-Heimer) was originally named Bernhard Levi, but he later changed his name.

Heiden was born in Frankfurt-am-Main in Germany and quickly became interested in music, composing his first pieces when he was six. When he began formal music lessons he learned music theory in addition to three instruments, piano, clarinet, and violin. Heiden entered the Hochschule für Musik in Berlin in 1929 at the age of nineteen and studied music composition under Paul Hindemith, the leading German composer of his day. His last year at the Hochschule brought him the Mendelssohn Prize in Composition.

In 1934 Heiden married Kola de Joncheere, a former student at the Hochschule that had been in his class, and in 1935 they emigrated to Detroit to leave Nazi Germany. Heiden taught at the Art Center Music School for eight years; during his teaching career he conducted the Detroit Chamber Orchestra in addition to giving piano, harpsichord, and general chamber music recitals. After having been naturalized as a United States citizen in 1941 he entered the army in 1943 to become an Assistant Bandmaster of the 445th Army Service Band, for whom he made over 100 arrangements. After the close of World War II Heiden entered Cornell University and received his M.A. two years later. He then joined the staff of the Indiana University School of Music, where he served as chair of the composition department until 1974. He remained composing music up until his death at the age of 89 in 2000.

Heiden's music is described by Nicolas Slonimsky, another composer, as "neoclassical in its formal structure, and strongly polyphonic in texture; it is distinguished also by its impeccable formal balance and effective instrumentation." Much of Heiden's music is for either wind or string chamber groups or solo instruments with piano, though he also wrote two symphonies, an opera ("The Darkened City"), a ballet ("Dreamers on a Slack Wire"), and vocal and incidental music for poetry and several of Shakespeare's plays.

His notable students include Donald Erb, Frederick A. Fox, and Carol Ann Weaver.

Selected works
Sonata for alto saxophone and piano (1937) - premiered by Larry Teal on 8 April 1937
Sonata for viola and piano (1959)
Quintet for French horn and string quartet (1952) - written for horn player John Barrows
Diversion for alto saxophone and band (1943) - Composer also reduced it for alto saxophone and piano (1984)
Fantasia Concertante for alto saxophone and band
Five Short Pieces for flute
Intrada for woodwind quintet and Alto Saxophone (1970) <CD: Cadenza 800 920 DDD (Bayer-Records, 1999)>
Voyage for band (1991)
Serenade for bassoon, violin, viola, and cello
Clarinet trio (two B clarinets and one bass clarinet)
Quintet for clarinet and strings (1955)
Solo for alto saxophone and piano (1969) – written for Eugene Rousseau
Sonata for horn and piano (1939)
Variations on “Liliburlero” for cello
Sonatina for flute
Sonata for Piano, Four Hands (1946)
The Darkened City (with libretto by Robert G. Kelly)(1962)
Dreamers on a Slack Wire (ballet)(1953)
Sonata for Cello and Piano
Euphorion: Scene for Orchestra (1949)
Concerto for Piano, Violin, Violincello and Orchestra (1956)
Concertino for String Orchestra (1967)
Concerto for Violincello and Orchestra (1967)
Concerto for Horn and Orchestra (1969)
Concerto for Tuba and Orchestra (1976)
Partita for Orchestra (1970)
Solo for Alto Saxophone and Piano (1969) <CD: Cadenza 800 920 DDD (Bayer-Records, 1999)>
Prelude, Theme and Variations for Alto Recorder (1994) <CD: Cadenza 800 920 DDD (Bayer-Records, 1999)>
Preludes for Flute, Double Bass and Harp (1988)<CD: Cadenza 800 920 DDD (Bayer-Records, 1999)>

References

External links
 Bernhard Heiden at G. Schirmer
 Interview with Bernhard Heiden, April 19, 1986

German male classical composers
German classical composers
American male classical composers
American classical composers
20th-century classical composers
Mendelssohn Prize winners
1910 births
2000 deaths
Pupils of Paul Hindemith
Musicians from Frankfurt
Berlin University of the Arts alumni
Cornell University alumni
Jewish emigrants from Nazi Germany to the United States
20th-century German composers
20th-century American composers
20th-century American male musicians